Etam is an unincorporated community in Preston County, West Virginia, United States.

The community most likely was named after the biblical place Etam.

References 

Unincorporated communities in West Virginia
Unincorporated communities in Preston County, West Virginia